The 1996 Oldham Bears season was the club's first season in the Super League. Coached by Andy Goodway, the Oldham Bears competed in Super League I and finished in 8th place. The club also reached the fourth round of the Challenge Cup.

Table

Squad
Statistics include appearances and points in the Super League and Challenge Cup.

References

External links
Oldham Bears - Rugby League Project

Oldham Bears
Oldham R.L.F.C.
English rugby league club seasons